Vietnam participated in the 2014 Asian Beach Games in Phuket, Thailand from 14 to 23 November 2014.

Vietnam also won 8 gold medals, 12 silver medals, 20 bronze medals and a total of 40 medals, finishing fifth on the medal table.

Competitors

Medal summary

Medal by sport

Medal by Date

Medalists

Multiple Gold Medalists

Air Sports

Beach Athletics

Beach Handball

Beach Sepaktakraw

Beach Soccer

Beach Volleyball

Beach Wrestling

Bodybuilding

Extreme Sports

Foot Volley

Ju-jitsu

Kurash

Marathon Swimming

Muaythai

Petanque

Triathlon

WaterSki

Woodball

External links

4th Asian Beach Game Phuket 2014 - (All Sports) NOC - Overview Vietnam

References

Nations at the 2014 Asian Beach Games
2014
Sport in Vietnam
Asian Beach Games